Khalid Saeed al-Bounein (Arabic: البوعينين خالد سعيد) is a Qatari real estate investor and charity coordinator and fundraiser in eastern Qatar. Al-Bounein worked for the defunct Madid Ahl al-Sham online fundraising campaign which has been cited as a conduit for financing the al-Nusra Front.

Charity efforts

Qatar Charity 
In early 2016, Al-Bounein volunteered with a Qatar Charity delegation to deliver relief materials to Syrian refugees in Iraq. The delegation delivered winter relief items to refugees in the Iraqi Kurdistan cities of Erbil, Sulaymaniyah, and Dohuk.

Madid Ahl al-Sham
In 2013, al-Bounein was mentioned as a point of contact in a Madid Ahl al-Sham call to donations. Al-Bounein's contact information is listed for residents of Doha that are interested in contributing to Madid Ahl al-Sham. Later calls for donations cite al-Bounein as the point of contact for residents of al-Rayyan, Nasiriyah, and al-Aziziya to donate to Madid Ahl al-Sham.

Madid Ahl al-Sham is a defunct online fundraising that was suspected of financing terrorist organizations. In 2012, the Washington Post reported that Jabhat al-Nusra cited the campaign “as one of the preferred conduits for donations intended for the group, which has pledged loyalty to al-Qaeda leader Ayman al-Zawahiri.”  In 2014, the U.S. Department of State described Madid Ahl al-Sham as an “online fundraising campaign that was suspected of sending funds to violent extremist elements in Syria.”

In Madid Ahl al-Sham's calls to donations, Al-Bounein's name is listed alongside Saad al-Kabi and Muhammad Isa al-Bakr as a point of contact for the Madid Ahl al-Sham campaign. Al-Kabi is a U.S. Department of the Treasury Specially Designated Global Terrorist (SDGT) for setting “up donation campaigns in Qatar to aid with fundraising in response to a request from an ANF associate for money to purchase both weapons and food.”  According to the Department of Treasury, al-Kabi also acted as an intermediary for ANF and worked closely with ANF fundraiser Hamid bin Abdallah al-Ali.

Arrest
In 2004, the Arab Commission for Human Rights released a report on arbitrary detention in Qatar. The report emphasized the organization's concern that Qatari authorities were not adhering to the law by making arbitrary arrests and holding the suspects without a trial. At the end of the report, al-Bounein is listed as one of ten detainees, many of which were also associated with Madid Ahl al-Sham, extremist elements, or are designated global terrorists.

Controversy
Khalid Saeed al-Bounein follows several controversial accounts on his personal Twitter account. In addition to following SDGT Umayr al-Nuaymi, al-Bounein also follows many accounts linked to the Salafist group active in Syria, Ahrar al-Sham. Al-Bounein also uses his Twitter account to promote quotes from Ibn Taymiyyah and Ibn Qayyim al-Jawziyya, among others. Ibn Taymiyyah and al-Jawziyya were Islamic theologians commonly referenced by Salafists for their ideas promoting Wahhabism, Salafism, and Jihadism.

References

Living people
Year of birth missing (living people)